Rio Linda High School is a high school located in Rio Linda, Sacramento, California, United States. It has an enrollment of 2,035 students. It is part of the Twin Rivers Unified School District, and was formerly part of the Grant Unified School District.

Rio Linda High School opened in 1962 and has been the one of the primary high schools for students in the Rio Linda/Elverta and Natomas Communities. It offers a wide range of extracurricular activities and academic opportunities.

Demographics
2,035 students attend Rio Linda High School. 41% of them are White, 22% are Hispanic, 13% are Asian, and 8% are African-American and 4% are Middle Eastern/Indian. 93% of the students receive a reduced price/free lunch and 19% of the student body (386 students) are English language learners. The 3 most commonly spoken languages spoken by English language learners at this school are Spanish (205 students), Hmong (86 students), and Russian (40 students) Punjabi/Urdu/Arabic (40 students)

Administration
The principal is Paul Orlando.

Rankings

In 2012, after evaluating 21,776 high schools across the nation, U.S. News & World Report awarded Rio Linda High School a silver medal. Rio Linda was ranked 1,605th nationally (top 8%) and 337th within the state of California (top 14%)

Academics
Rio Linda High School offers many AP Courses including:

 AP Chemistry
 AP Physics B
 AP Physics C
 AP Calculus AB
 AP Calculus BC
 AP Biology
 AP English Literature
 AP Language and Composition
 AP Spanish Literature
 AP Government
 AP World History
 AP Macroeconomics
 AP United States History
 AP Music
 AP Studio Art
 AP French/Hmong/Spanish

Rio Linda High School also offers many ROP and CTE Courses including:

 3D Design
 Accounting
 Agriculture
 Animal Science
 Architectural Design
 Architectural Drawing
 Art
 AVID
 Beginning Band
 Beginning Choir
 Concert Band
 Concert Choir
 Computer Applications
 Computer Graphics
 Culinary Arts
 Digital Media
 Entrepreneurship & Virtual Enterprise
 Floral Arranging
 Guitar Beginners & Advanced
 Introduction to Business
 Jazz Band
 JROTC
 Knights News(RLKN)(School News Program Production)
 KRIO Radio Evolved(School 24-hour Radio Station)
 Leadership/ASB
 'nightwind
 Marching Band
 Marketing
 Metal Works & Welding
 Piano Beginner & Advanced
 Radio Broadcasting
 Rio NYN
 ROP Market Merchandise
 ROP Retail Sales
 ROP Web Page Design
 Small Business
 Sound Engineering
 Symphonic Band
 T-shirt Design and Production
 Teacher Aide
 Television Occupations
 Video Production
 Vocal Jazz

Recent graduates have attended high-ranked universities such as Stanford University, Brown University, Columbia University, CalTECH, University of the Pacific, UCLA, UC Berkeley, UC Davis, and UC San Diego.

Clubs

Academic Decathlon                                                       
Anime                                                                            
Archery
Bible Club
Broadcasting
Celtic
California Scholarship Federation
Cultural Diversity club 
Drama
FFA
French
Friday Night Live
Future Business Leaders of America
Future Farmers of America
Gay Straight Alliance
Hmong Club
Key Club
Math Club
MECHA
MESA
Music
Polynesian
Spanish
Science Bowl
Latinos Unidos
Green Club
Spirit Club
Link Crew

Sports

Baseball
Basketball
Cheerleading
Cross Country 
Football
Golf
Rugby
Soccer
Softball
Swimming
Tennis
Track & Field
Volleyball
Water Polo
Wrestling

Notable alumni
 Jay Mosley, member of the Missouri House of Representatives
Darren Oliver, Major League Baseball player
 Justin E. H. Smith, philosopher and author

Kay Ivey, the current governor of Alabama, taught at the school in the 1960s

References

External links 

Rio Linda
Public high schools in California
1962 establishments in California